David Mostyn may refer to:
 David Mostyn (British Army officer)
 David Mostyn (cartoonist)